256 (two hundred [and] fifty-six) is the natural number following 255 and preceding 257.

In mathematics
256 is a composite number, with the factorization 256 = 28, which makes it a power of two.
 256 is 4 raised to the 4th power, so in tetration notation, 256 is 24.
 256 is the value of the expression , where .
 256 is a perfect square (162).
 256 is the only 3-digit number that is zenzizenzizenzic.
 256 is the lowest number that is a product of eight prime factors.
 256 is the number of parts in all compositions of 7.

In computing 
One octet (in most cases one byte) is equal to eight bits and has 28 or 256 possible values, counting from 0 to 255.  The number 256 often appears in computer applications (especially on 8-bit systems) such as:
 The typical number of different values in each color channel of a digital color image (256 values for red, 256 values for green, and 256 values for blue used for 24-bit color) (see color space or Web colors).
 The number of colors available in a GIF or a 256-color (8-bit) bitmap.
 The number of characters in extended ASCII and Latin-1.
 The number of columns available in a Microsoft Excel worksheet until Excel 2007.
 The split-screen level in Pac-Man, which results from the use of a single byte to store the internal level counter.
 A 256-bit integer can represent up to 115,792,089,237,316,195,423,570,985,008,687,907,853,269,984,665,640,564,039,457,584,007,913,129,639,936 values.
 The number of bits in the SHA-256 cryptographic hash.
 The branding number of nVidia's GeForce 256.

References 

Integers